Joydebpur Junction Railway Station is a railway junction in Gazipur District of Dhaka Division in Bangladesh.

History
Joydebpur railway station came up when Dacca State Railway constructed the Narayanganj-Mymensingh metre gauge railway track in 1884–85.

Consequent to the construction of the  Jamuna Bridge in 1998, there was reassessment of the requirements of the railways. First, a  new dual gauge line was to be constructed from Joydebpur to Jamtoil, to connect the eastern part of the Bangladesh railway system to the western part. The problem of two different gauges in two different parts of the country was solved by introducing dual gauge.  Second, a  length of broad gauge track from Jamtoil to parbatipur was to be converted to dual gauge. This made Joydebpur, a dual gauge railway station.

References

Railway stations in Gazipur District
Railway junction stations in Bangladesh
Railway stations opened in 1885